The Pact is a 2018 Spanish supernatural horror thriller film directed by  which stars Belén Rueda, Darío Grandinetti and Mireia Oriol.

Plot 
Desperately seeking to save the life of her ailing daughter Clara, who has just entered a coma, Mónica strikes a Faustian-like bargain that entails the prospect of beginning to kill people.

Cast

Production 
The Pact, David Victori's directorial feature debut, is an Ikiru Films, 4Cats Pictures, Sony Pictures International Productions and El Pacto La Película AIE production, with the participation of TVE, TVC, Movistar+ and Vodafone and support from ICAA and ICEC. Shooting wrapped in 2017; shooting locations included Barcelona.

Release 
Distributed by Sony Pictures Entertainment Iberia, the film was theatrically released on 17 August 2018 in Spain, where it grossed €447,210 in the opening weekend, good enough for a top-4 picture in the box office.

Reception 
Beatriz Martínez of Fotogramas scored 3 out of 5 stars, highlighting the power of the moral questions the film raises as well as Belén Rueda's performance as the best things about the film while considering the film's lack of originality as a drawback, writing that the film "suffers from its formulaic nature and the repetition of patterns".

Jordi Costa of El País suggested that the people behind the film were seeking a market-driven approach by "reiterating formulas that have previously proven their cost-effectiveness and solvency" but that, even if there is nothing wrong with the former, "the problem is that there is also nothing really disturbing, potentially Luciferian" in the film.

Reviewing for El Mundo'''s magazine Metrópoli, Francisco Marinero rated the film with 1 out of 5 stars writing about "a diffuse plot in which Belén Rueda shines for her way of playing the film's protagonist with talent, which has now become a profession".

Jonathan Holland of The Hollywood Reporter described The Pact as "elegant, very atmospheric and cleverly worked out", but "surprisingly" failing at delivering "the emotional connections that could have taken it to the next level".

 See also 
 List of Spanish films of 2018

 References 

 External links 
 The Pact at ICAA's Catálogo de Cinespañol''

Films shot in Barcelona
Ikiru Films films
2018 horror thriller films
Spanish supernatural horror films
2010s Spanish-language films
Spanish horror thriller films
2010s Spanish films
2010s supernatural thriller films